Swatara Gap is a water gap through Blue Mountain formed by the Swatara Creek in Lebanon County, Pennsylvania. PA Route 72 as well as Interstate 81 pass through the gap. The Appalachian Trail passes through the gap over the Waterville Bridge in Swatara State Park. The area was a fossil collecting site.

See also
 Geology of Pennsylvania

References

Water gaps of Pennsylvania
Landforms of Lebanon County, Pennsylvania
Geology of Pennsylvania